The Instruments Research & Development Establishment (IRDE) is a laboratory of the Defence Research & Development Organization (DRDO). Located in Dehradun, its primary function is research and development in the field of optical and electro-optical instrumentation. Their objective is to develop products like night vision devices, electro-optical surveillance and fire control systems.

Products

Holographic Sight 
The IRDE has developed holographic sights which are manufactured by the ORD, and have a range of up to 300m. The army has already put in a demand for 20,000 holographic device units while the National Security Guards has shown interest in the device and requested some units.

References

External links
 IRDE Website

Defence Research and Development Organisation laboratories
Research institutes in Dehradun
Research and development in India
Research institutes established in 1960
1960 establishments in Uttar Pradesh